Events in the year 2009 in Belarus.

Incumbents 

 President: Alexander Lukashenko
 Prime Minister: Mikhail Myasnikovich

Events

Deaths 

 8 September – Aleksandr Aksyonov, former Prime Minister of Byelorussian SSR and Soviet Ambassador to Poland (b. 1924).

See also 

 List of years in Belarus
 2009 in Belarus

References

External links 

 

 
Years of the 21st century in Belarus
2000s in Belarus
Belarus
Belarus